ESPN Radio 1050 could refer to:

 WAMN, a radio station serving the Bluefield, WV market
 WEPN (AM), a radio station serving the New York market
 WLYC, a radio station serving the Williamsport, PA market